A forktail is a type of small bird found in Asia.

Forktail may also refer to:
Green junglefowl, a species of bird in the pheasant family
Forktail (journal), journal of the Oriental Bird Club
Ischnura, a genus of damselfly

See also